Hornberg Castle is a partially ruined castle located on a steep outcrop above the Neckar valley above the village Neckarzimmern, between Bad Wimpfen and Mosbach. It is the largest and oldest of the castles in the valley.

History

The original castle was built in the 11th century. It is notable as the stronghold of Götz von Berlichingen, who bought it in 1517 and died there in 1562. The castle was bought by Reinhard of Gemmingen in 1612 and remains in possession of the Gemmingen-Hornberg family today. It was uninhabited from 1738 and left to decay until 1825, when it was partially restored. It has housed a museum since 1968.

It also housed students from the University of Wisconsin-Stevens Point  College of Natural Resources for an annual summer exchange program.

See also 
 List of castles in Baden-Württemberg

Notes

References
G. H. Bidermann: Burg Hornberg, Wohnsitz des Ritters Götz von Berlichingen, Rüstzeugschau 1980. Journal Verlag Schwend GmbH, Schwäbisch Hall 1980

Hill castles
Landmarks in Germany
Ruined castles in Germany
Buildings and structures completed in the 11th century